Salalah is the capital and largest city of the southern Omani governorate of Dhofar. Its population in 2009 was about 197,169.

Salalah is the third-largest city in the Sultanate of Oman, and the largest city in the Dhofar Province. Salalah is the birthplace of the former sultan, Qaboos bin Said. Salalah attracts many people from other parts of Oman and the Persian Gulf region during the monsoon/khareef season, which spans from June to September. The climate of the region and the monsoon allows the city to grow some vegetables and fruits like coconut and bananas. There are many gardens within the city where these vegetables and fruits grow.

History
Salalah was the traditional capital of Dhofar, which reached the peak of prosperity in the 13th century thanks to the incense trade. Later it decayed, and in the 19th century it was absorbed by the Sultanate of Muscat.

Between 1932 and 1970, Salalah was the residence of Said bin Taimur, the Sultan of Sultanate of Oman Sultan Qaboos acceded to his father's throne in 1970, and decided to move his capital to Muscat, the largest city in Oman, where he lived until he quietly left for treatment in Germany. His absence was much regretted in Salalah, where his palace was always kept ready to receive him.  His Majesty's last visits were in 2006 to meet influential tribal and local leaders, and in 2010 to celebrate the 40th anniversary of his accession with a massive parade watched for several hours by an estimated hundred thousand spectators.
 
Despite the Sultan's generally benevolent government running Oman without national taxation thanks to its vast mineral resources, and with all menial work done by Asian labourers, Salalah saw peaceful protests for a few months in 2011 in the domino effect of the Arab Spring. Some Omani protesters requested the dismissal of current ministers, better job opportunities, salary increases, a solution to the increasing cost of living, or the establishment of Islamic banks.

City districts and suburbs
Al-Dahariz
Al-Haffa
AL-Qouf
Al-Mughsail
Al-Mutaaza
Al-Saada
Al-Wadi
Auqad
City Center
Eastern Salalah
Ittin
New Salalah
Western Salalah (also known as Al-Gharbia, and Al-Qantra)

Climate

The city has a hot desert climate (Köppen climate classification BWh), although summers are cooler than in more northern or inland parts of Oman. Salalah is very cloudy and foggy during the monsoon months of July and August, even though relatively little rain falls. Khareef means "autumn" in Arabic but it refers to monsoon when describing the region around Salalah. During this time, the brown landscape of Salalah and its surroundings is completely transformed to a beautiful and lush greenery.

Demographics

Religion
The city, like many other in Arab states of the Arabian peninsula, has a relatively large expatriate community, mainly from India, Pakistan, Bangladesh, and Philippines.

The majority of the Omani population (98.9%) in Salalah is Muslim. There is also a considerable population of Hindus, Christians, Buddhists, and Sikhs in the expatriate community.

Language
Arabic is the official language. The unofficial, unwritten language known as Jeballi is the second most spoken language and the mother tongue of many in Salalah and its surrounding areas, with 25,000 estimated speakers as of 1993.

English is the official foreign language and the most spoken language of the expats. Malayalam is another popular language and together with Tamil, Telugu, along with Hindi and Somali are widely spoken language among expatriates.

Notable people

Economy

APM Terminals, part of the A. P. Moller-Maersk Group of Denmark, manages the Port of Salalah; one of the largest ports on the Arabian Peninsula which is an important transshipment hub for container shipping in the area. The Port of Salalah is also one of the most vital ports on the peninsula connecting together Africa, the Middle East, and Asia. But the port is outside the city, to the south. It is also the largest private employer in the Dhofar region. The Salalah Free Zone, situated right beside the port, is emerging as a new center for heavy industries in the Middle East.

Tourist attractions
Salalah has an international tourist economy with many Middle Eastern tourists during the Khareef season from June to September. In this season the mountains turn green, and there are many waterfalls to visit, such as at Wadi Darbat, Ain Athum, Ain Tubrook, and Ain Khor. There are four reputed tombs of Islamic prophets: Nabi Imran, possibly the Virgin Mary's father but more likely a local prophet; Nabi Ayoob, the biblical Job; Nabi Houd; and Nabi Salih. The city received more than 600,000 tourists during the khareef season in 2017. Amongst the Dhofar Governorate's cultural attractions is the Salalah carnival, which includes the usual rides, family activities, concerts, cultural events and vendors.

Sports

Salalah is known as the home of some of the best football clubs in Oman. In total, Salalah has four sport clubs based in the city: Salalah Club, Al-Ittihad, Al-Nasr, and Dhofar (the most successful club in the League with 11 trophies).

Dhofar F.C. have been nicknamed as "Al-Zaeem", or "The Leaders", due to their enormous success in both the Omani League, and in the Sultan Qaboos Cup.  Dhofar have also have an adequate number of trophies in sports like volleyball, and handball. Al-Nasr have also been known for their great success in football, winning the Omani League five times, and the Sultan Qaboos Cup 4 times. Al-Nasr, like Dhofar, have also been successful in other sports such as hockey, basketball, volleyball, and handball.

Salalah currently has two stadiums, the Salalah Sports Complex (also known as the "Youth Sports Complex"), which is the only multi-purpose stadium in Salalah.  The newer, Al-Saadah Stadium is the newly built stadium in Al-Saada district of Salalah devoted to football.  Incorporated in the walls of the sports complex apart from the football stadium is a hockey field, tennis court, Olympic swimming pool, and indoor volleyball/basketball court. Al-Saada Stadium is the venue where Saudi national football team, and the Omani national team first met in Salalah on August 12, 2009.

The most popular sport played among the youth is by far football. It is very normal to see a group of boys and young men from around the area playing in makeshift fields in parking lots, or in a large open area. Beach football is also a common sight to see along the beach in the Al-Haffa district. Another popular sport in Salalah is volleyball. Although not as popular as football the game is frequently played, special in the beach of Salalah.

Education
Currently Salalah has two colleges, the Salalah College of Technology and Salalah College of Applied Science, both of which are government owned and sponsored.

The Salalah College of Applied Sciences incorporates an English Department. Its aim is to offer students a solid grasp of the English language so that they may go on to complete further studies in important sectors such as I.T. and Communication and Design.

Salalah is also home to a private university, Dhofar University which is one of the largest in the region. It has significant shares owned by Mustahil Al-Mashani, uncle of Sultan Qaboos bin Said. Recently the university has constructed a new campus worth 25 million OR.

The Indian School Salalah is an Indian-run, self-financing, co-educational institution, primarily established to meet the academic needs of children of Indian expatriates working in Salalah. The Indian School Salalah is the largest English-medium school in Salalah and it also admits children of other nationalities. The school is located in the North Dahariz area, of Salalah town.

Pakistan School Salalah is a Pakistani co-educational high school which was established in the year 1982. The school is situated adjacent to the Indian School in Salalah Dahariz north.

British School Salalah was founded in 1970. The school follows the National Curriculum of England and Wales, and offers schooling to children from Reception to Year 10 (Year 11 from August 2021). It is also situated in Dahariz next to the Indian School and Pakistani School.

Transportation

Air transport

Salalah International Airport mainly caters to domestic flights from Muscat and some International flights from India and regional Arab countries such as Qatar, U.A.E, and Saudi Arabia. Oman Air, the national airline operates five flights daily from Salalah to Muscat, the capital city and also two flights to Dubai weekly. Oman Air introduced Oman Air Pass for regular travelers between Salalah and Muscat. Qatar Airways has daily flights from Salalah to Doha connecting to over 130 destinations worldwide. Very convenient connections are available to destinations in Europe, the Americas, Africa, Asia and Australia. There is also a direct weekly flight from and to Kochi, Kozhikode (Calicut), and Thiruvananthapuram operated by Air India Express for the Malayalee expatriates. During the Khareef Season (Monsoons) there are weekly flights to other international destinations including Sweden and Turkey. There are also transit flights to almost all countries. The new International airport opened on 15 June 2015 and the old Airport has since then been converted into a Domestic and emergency Airport.

Bus
There is a daily bus service from Deira, Dubai, UAE to Salalah at 3pm. There is daily bus service between Muscat and Salalah from many bus service providers.

Public transport
Salalah did not have a public transportation system within the city limits until 2018, but in 2019 Sultan Qaboos announced a bus service within the city from Salalah airport to city center and city center to Salalah port.

Oman National Transport Company (Mwasalat) has started daily public bus service in Salalah from December 2018.

Long-distance air-conditioned buses are operated daily from Salalah to Haima, Muscat, Nizwa, Al-Buraimi, Dubai, Al-Ain, Al-Ghaydah, Mukalla, and Seiyun, as well as PDO locations such as Marmul.

Other forms of public transport popular in Salalah are taxis. Generally fares vary from half a Rial to 2 Rials depending on the distance to destination. Taxis are color-coded orange and white and provide semi-personal transportation in the form of both individual hire and the same opportunistic roadway service as Baisa buses, which are not as popular in the city.

Minibuses, colour-coded orange and white, are unmetered like taxis, after several government initiatives to introduce meters were rejected. The fare is set by way of negotiation, although drivers usually adhere to certain unwritten rules for fares within the city. One should always find out the normally accepted fare for one's journey from one's hotel or host before looking for a taxi.

Water transport

The Port of Salalah is one of the deepwater ports in Oman and also eleventh-busiest transshipment port in the world, second-busiest port in the Middle East, which is located at Port Raysut (Salalah). It can accommodate large vessels up to 18m draft. It is the main container tran-shipment terminal of the region. This port is operated and managed by Salalah Port Services Company (S.A.O.G.). The port also welcomes cruise liners and luxury ships.

Media
The English-language radio stations are Hi FM and Merge, which are the only English-language stations in Oman. There are also a number of Arabic radio channels. In Salalah almost all TV channels are available.

Gallery

See also

 Bountiful (Book of Mormon)#Salalah
 Duqm
 List of cities in Oman
 Museum of the Land of Frankincense
 Okkad
 Owtar

References

External links

 Beautiful Salalah
 Salalah - City of the Prophets
 Port of Salalah

 
Port cities in the Arabian Peninsula
Indian Ocean
Populated places in the Dhofar Governorate
Port cities and towns of the Arabian Sea